Melchor Soria Vera (died 1643) was a Roman Catholic prelate who served as Auxiliary Bishop of Toledo (1602–1643) and Titular Bishop of Troas (1602–1643).

Biography
On 17 June 1602, Melchor Soria Vera was appointed during the papacy of Pope Clement VIII as Auxiliary Bishop of Toledo and Titular Bishop of Troas. He served as Auxiliary Bishop of Toledo until his death in 1643. 

While bishop, he was the principal consecrator of Diego Castejón Fonseca, Bishop of Lugo (1634).

References 

16th-century Roman Catholic bishops in Spain
1643 deaths
Bishops appointed by Pope Clement VIII